The June L. Mazer Lesbian Archives is a grass roots archive dedicated to collecting, protecting, and conserving lesbian and feminist women's history. The Archives was founded in 1981 as the West Coast Lesbian Collections (WCLC) by Lynn Fonfa and Cherrie Cox in Oakland, California.

After establishing a board of directors, the WCLC was granted 501(c)(3) nonprofit status. In 1985, WCLC relocated to Southern California with the help of Connexxus Women's Center, Jean Conger, and the Gay and Lesbian Task Force of the City of West Hollywood, and was maintained in the home of June L. Mazer and her partner Nancy "Bunny" MacCulloch in Altadena, California. The two women were custodians of the WCLC until Mazer's death from cancer in 1987. MacCulloch thereafter changed its name to the June L. Mazer Lesbian Archives and continued to run the collection with the assistance of volunteers. On November 28, 1988, the Mazer Archives moved from Altadena into the Werle Building, a space donated by the City of West Hollywood. The following year, it received 501(c)(3) nonprofit status.

In 1989, the Mazer Archives created an outreach and collection-building partnership with the UCLA Center for the Study of Women and the UCLA Library Department of Special Collections of the Charles E. Young Research Library. In 2011, it co-hosted the 3rd LGBT Archives, Libraries, Museums & Special Collections Conference. In 2015, Wolfe Video donated 100 lesbian movies to the Archives.

The June L. Mazer Lesbian Archives describes itself as "the only archive on this side of the continent that is dedicated exclusively to preserving lesbian history...The Archives is committed to gathering and preserving materials by and about lesbians and feminists of all classes, ethnicities, races and experiences." It is supported by funding from private donors and the City of West Hollywood, and has been run strictly by volunteers since 1985.

See also

 GLBT Historical Society
 Herstory
 Lesbian Herstory Archives
 ONE National Gay & Lesbian Archives

References

External links 
 
  Making Invisible Histories Visible: A Resource Guide to the Collections. June L. Mazer Lesbian Archives, UCLA Center for the Study of Women, 2014
 June L. Mazer Lesbian Archives at UCLA
  June Mazer Lesbian Archives Programming Comp[i]lation (2012) at YouTube
  The Mazer Lesbian Archives and Women (2012) at YouTube
  June L. Mazer Lesbian Archives Serving the Community for 32 Years! (2013) at YouTube
  Mazer Tour by We Ho TV (2013) at YouTube
  Bay Area Lesbian Archives (San Francisco Bay Area lesbian history collection)

1981 in LGBT history
Organizations established in 1981
Feminism in California
Lesbian culture in California
Lesbian feminism
LGBT museums and archives
Archives in the United States
Lesbian history in the United States
Lesbian organizations in the United States
Organizations based in Oakland, California
LGBT culture in the San Francisco Bay Area